Quiescence (/kwiˈɛsəns/) is a state of quietness or inactivity. It may refer to:

 Quiescence search, in game tree searching (adversarial search) in artificial intelligence, a quiescent state is one in which a game is considered stable and unlikely to change drastically the next few plays
 Seed dormancy, a form of delayed seed germination
 Quiescent phase, the first part of the first stage of childbirth
 The G0 phase of a cell in the cell cycle; quiescence is the state of a cell when it is not dividing
 Quiescent current (biasing) in an electronic circuit
 Quiescent consistency is one of the safety properties for concurrent data structures

See also
 Rest (disambiguation)